Great Kings' War is an English language science fiction novel by John F. Carr and Roland J. Green, a sequel to H. Beam Piper's Lord Kalvan of Otherwhen. It continues the story of Corporal Calvin Morrison after he is transported to another timeline by a Paratime conveyor.  The book was released in two editions, one in 1985  and the revised and expanded edition in 2000 .

Having saved his new nation of Hos-Hostigos from destruction only last year, Calvin Morrison (now King Kalvan) faces the House of Styphon in a new military campaign.  Kalvan once more draws upon his knowledge of his home timeline's military history to meet a greater threat.

Plot
Great Kings' War begins near the end of the colder than usual "Winter of Wolves" which has followed the war between Hostigos and its neighbours and the founding of Hos-Hostigos. While Great King Kalvan of Hos-Hostigos (formerly Corporal Calvin Morrison, Pennsylvania State Police) leads wolf and bandit hunts throughout his realm, the archpriests of Styphon's House plot their next move against Kalvan. As spring arrives Kalvan learns through the work of his intelligence officers Klestreus and Skranga that, in addition to the threat from Styphon's House, he must also face the armies of King Kaiphranos of Hos-Harphax, who seeks to regain the princedoms lost to Kalvan the previous year.

To meet this two-fronted war Kalvan sends his father-in-law Ptosphes, Prince of Old Hostigos, as well as Princes Balthar of Beshta and Sarrask of Sask to meet the Holy Host of Styphon's House under Grand Master Soton in Beshta while he personally invades Hos-Harphax in the hope of capturing Harphax City and ending the reign of King Kaiphranos.

Kalvan's campaign goes very well and he decimates the Harphaxi forces in the Battle of Chothros Heights, killing Crown Prince Philesteus of Hos-Harphax. Kalvan is preparing to press his advantage when he receives news that Ptosphes has been defeated by the Holy Host at Tenabra Town because of the treachery of Balthar of Beshta.

Kalvan immediately abandons his plans and rushes to reinforce Ptosphes and defend Hostigos from the Holy Host at the climactic Battle of Phyrax a few miles from Kalvan's artillery foundry and the new University of Hostigos. With both sides taking extreme casualties during the day-long battle the forces of Hostigos manage to repel the Holy Host and send Soton back to Styphon's House disgraced in defeat. In the immediate aftermath Kalvan receives news that his wife Queen Rylla has been safely delivered of a healthy daughter, Princess Demia.

Afterward Kalvan sends Ptosphes north to fight Great King Demistophon of Hos-Agrys who has invaded Hos-Hostigos believing it to be defenceless where he defeats them in multiple small battles. Meanwhile, Kalvan invades Beshta and besieges Tarr-Beshta using siege tactics from his own timeline and executes Balthar for treason and seizes the miserly prince's massive treasury. The story ends with Kalvan happily reunited with Rylla and his new daughter for a peaceful winter while he prepares for the next year's battles.

Characters

Returning Characters
 Great King Kalvan
 Queen Rylla
 Prince Ptosphes
 Prince Sarrask
 Prince Balthames
 Prince Balthar
 Highpriest Xentos
 Alkides
 Great King Kaiphranos

New Characters
 Xykos
 Princess Demia
 Aspasthar
 Grand Master Soton
 Knight Commander Aristocles
 Captain-General Phidestros
 Supreme Priest Sesklos
 Archpriest Anaxthenes
 Archpriest Dracar
 Archpriest Roxthar
 Archpriest Cimon
 Great King Demistophon

References
 John F. Carr and Roland Green, Great Kings' War, Ace Science Fiction Books, 1985
 John F. Carr and Roland Green, Great Kings' War, Pequod Press, 2006

Kalvan series
Novels by John F. Carr
Novels by Roland J. Green
1985 American novels
1985 science fiction novels
Ace Books books